Sturm und Drang was a Finnish heavy metal/hard rock band from Vaasa formed in 2004. The band's original members were lead singer/guitarist André Linman, guitarist/backing vocals Alexander Ivars, keyboardist Jesper Welroos, bassist/backing vocalist Henrik Kurkiala and drummer/backing vocalist Calle Fahllund. Other members were bassist Joel Wendlin (joined 2010) and guitarist Jani Kuoppamaa (joined 2011). The band started off as schoolmates covering bands such as Judas Priest and gradually started writing their own material. They were discovered in 2005 by record label HMC. Their debut album Learning to Rock was released in 2007 and eventually went platinum in Finland. Their second album Rock 'n Roll Children was released in 2008 and went gold within less than a week. The band is known for songs "Rising Son", "Indian" and "A Million Nights". As of 2010, the band has sold over 100,000 records. In 2014 the band broke up when members left to start their own separated projects.

History 
The band started in 2004 when André Linman and Henrik Kurkiala were on their way home from a Judas Priest concert. The name for the band was suggested by Henrik's father. Shortly afterwards Jesper Welroos and Calle Fahllund joined the band, and they had their first practice in Calle's basement. A few weeks later they performed in their first concert. Later they realized that they needed one more guitar player, and Alexander Ivars became their fifth member. The band got more gigs and played at Stafettkarnevalen 2004 in Vaasa, also making a cover of Dio's Rainbow In The Dark. In 2007, they already played as the headline on Stafettkarnevalen.

André, Jesper, Calle, Alexander and Henrik belong to the minority of Swedish-speaking Finns. When their first album was published in 2007, the boys were only 15–16 years old.

In February 2010, bassist Henrik Kurkiala left Sturm und Drang. The new bassist is called Joel Wendlin and is a lifelong friend of the band. As of 2011, Alexander Ivars has also left the band. His replacement is Jani Kuoppamaa, who had previously stepped in for Ivars when he had been unable to attend.

In April 2011, the band had recorded two tracks for their upcoming third album. In March 2012, the album was ready for release in the Nordic countries, Central Europe and Japan without mixing. In total, the band made 30 songs, 10 of which were released on the album. On 21 September 2012, the band released a new album called Graduation Day. Its first single is called "Molly the Murderer". The music video for the song has been directed by Marko Mäkilaakso. The second single on the album, Goddamn Liar, was released in September 2012.

The band was made into a documentary called Like a rockstar in 2014. The documentary was produced by Pampas Produktion AB. The band quit in 2014 when its members began to have other plans.

In March 2019, it was announced that the band's original members André Linman and Jeppe Welroos would do a duet tour together called "An Evening With Sturm und Drang featuring André Linman & Jeppe Welroos".

Influences 
Sturm und Drang's biggest influence is Patrick Linman, the father of singer André Linman, who has previously played in the barracks band Not Yet and later in the light music band Place-2-Go. Patrick wrote all the songs with André, and also served as the band's manager. Members of Sturm und Drang have described Kiss, Iron Maiden, Dio, and Judas Priest as musical influences.

Record deal 
In 2005, Sturm und Drang recorded the demo Rising Son which they sent to Helsinki Music Company. The boss for HMC, Asko Kallonen, who had not taken them seriously, changed opinion after hearing them play live with the Swedish garage rock band The Hellacopters. He gave the band their record deal, and shortly afterwards they started to record their first album, Learning to Rock. In 2007 they also got a new record company, GUN Records, which would release their debut album in the whole of Europe except for Scandinavia.

After the 30 May release of their album in Finland, Learning to Rock climbed to number three on the official chart of record sales in Finland.1

Members

Final lineup 
 André Linman – lead vocals, guitars (2004–2014)
 Calle Fahllund – drums, backing vocals (2004–2014)
 Jesper Welroos – keyboards (2004–2014)
 Joel Wendlin – bass, backing vocals (2010–2014)
 Jani Kuoppamaa – guitars (2011–2014)

Former members 
 Henrik Kurkiala – bass, backing vocals (2004–2010)
 Alexander Ivars – guitars, backing vocals (2004–2011)

Discography

Albums

Singles

References

External links 

 
 Sturm und Drang at Myspace

Finnish musical groups
Finnish power metal musical groups
Musical groups established in 2004